Emamzadeh Abdol Aziz (also Romanized as Emāmzādeh ʿAbdol ʿAzīz; also known as Emāmzādeh ‘Abdollāh and Emāmzādeh Shāhzādeh ‘Abdollāh) is a village in Emamzadeh Abdol Aziz Rural District, Jolgeh District, Isfahan County, Isfahan Province, Iran. At the 2006 census, its population was 2,297, in 591 families.

References 

Populated places in Isfahan County